The year 2019 was the 27th year in the history of the Ultimate Fighting Championship (UFC), a mixed martial arts promotion based in the United States.

Releases and retirements

These fighters have either been released from their UFC contracts, announced their retirement or joined other promotions.

Abdul-Kerim Edilov - Released in May - Light Heavyweight
Abel Trujillo - Released in May - Lightweight
Allan Zuniga - Released in December - Lightweight 
Allen Crowder - Retired in November - Heavyweight
Alex Garcia - Released in September - Welterweight
Alex Gorgees - Released in May - Lightweight 
Álvaro Herrera - Released in March - Lightweight
Amanda Cooper - Signed with Invicta Fighting Championships in July - Women's Strawweight
Andre Soukhamthath - Released in November - Bantamweight
Andrew Holbrook - Released in June - Lightweight
Antonio Trocoli - Released after testing positive for nandrolone in August - Heavyweight
Arjan Bhullar - Signed with ONE Championship in July - Heavyweight
Artem Lobov - Granted release from the UFC in January - Featherweight
Ashkan Mokhtarian - Released in May - Flyweight
Austin Arnett - Released in September - Featherweight
Azamat Murzakanov - Released in October - Light Heavyweight
Ben Askren - Retired in November - Welterweight
B.J. Penn - Released in September - Lightweight
Bobby Moffett - Released in November - Featherweight
Boston Salmon - Released in December - Bantamweight
Brandon Moreno - Released in February - Flyweight
Bryan Caraway - Released in May - Bantamweight
Cain Velasquez - Retired in October - Heavyweight
Carlo Pedersoli Jr. - Released in August - Welterweight
Cat Zingano - Released in August - Women's Bantamweight
C. B. Dollaway - Released in December - Middleweight
Chan-Mi Jeon - Released in March - Women's Strawweight
Craig White - Released in January - Welterweight
Cris Cyborg - Released in August - Women's Featherweight
Curtis Millender - Released in November - Welterweight
Dan Moret - Released in October - Lightweight
Danilo Belluardo - Released in November - Lightweight
Darrell Horcher - Released in December - Lightweight
David Branch - Released in September after being suspended by USADA - Middleweight
Dennis Bermudez - Retired in January - Lightweight
Derrick Krantz - Released in November - Welterweight
Devin Powell - Released in September - Lightweight
Dmitry Smolyakov - Released in May - Heavyweight
Dustin Ortiz - Released in February - Flyweight
Elias Theodorou - Released in May - Middleweight
Eric Shelton - Released in May - Flyweight
Felipe Silva - Released in May - Lightweight
Georges St-Pierre - Retired in February - Middleweight
Gilbert Melendez - Released in November - Featherweight
Gray Maynard - Released in November - Lightweight
Humberto Bandenay - Released in October - Featherweight
Igor Pokrajac - Released in May - Light Heavyweight
Ivan Shtyrkov - Released in June after testing positive for a banned substance - Heavyweight
Henry Briones - Released in November - Bantamweight
Jason Gonzalez - Released in December - Lightweight
Jason Knight - Released in January - Featherweight
Jessica Aguilar - Released in May - Women's Strawweight
Jesus Pinedo - Released in April - Lightweight
Jimi Manuwa - Retired in May - Light Heavyweight
Jo Sung-Bin - Released in August - Featherweight
Joby Sanchez - Released in January - Flyweight
John Lineker - Released in July - Bantamweight
John Moraga - Released in February - Flyweight
Jon Tuck - Released in September - Lightweight
Jonathan Wilson - Released in August - Middleweight
Jordan Johnson - Signed with the Professional Fighters League in March - Middleweight
Jordan Rinaldi - Released in May - Featherweight
Joseph Morales - Released in May - Flyweight
Josh Burkman - Released in April - Welterweight
Julian Erosa - Released in October - Featherweight
Juliana Lima - Signed with Invicta Fighting Championships in January - Women's Strawweight
Justin Frazier - Released in February - Heavyweight
Justin Willis - Released in May - Heavyweight
Keita Nakamura - Released in September - Welterweight
Kurt Holobaugh - Released in December - Lightweight 
Kyle Stewart - Released in November - Welterweight
Lauren Mueller - Released in December - Women's Flyweight
Liz Carmouche - Released in December - Women's Flyweight
Maia Stevenson - Released in November - Strawweight
Marcelo Golm - Released in May - Heavyweight
Matheus Nicolau - Released in February - Flyweight
Matt Bessette - Released in January - Featherweight
Melinda Fábián - Released in July - Women's Flyweight
Myles Jury - Signed with Bellator MMA in July - Featherweight
Naoki Inoue - Released in January - Flyweight
Nick Diaz - Retired in February - Middleweight
Nick Hein - Retired in May - Lightweight
Nohelin Hernandez - Released in November - Bantamweight
Patrick Cummins - Retired in December - Light Heavyweight
Rashad Coulter - Released in February - Light Heavyweight
Renan Barão - Released in December - Featherweight
Rolando Dy - Released in January - Featherweight
Ross Pearson - Retired in April - Lightweight
Rostem Akman - Released in December - Welterweight
Ruslan Magomedov - Released in April - Heavyweight
Ryan MacDonald - Released in September - Bantamweight
Sarah Frota - Released in September - Women's Flyweight
Sérgio Moraes - Released in November - Welterweight
Sergio Pettis - Signed with Bellator MMA in October - Flyweight
Sheymon Moraes - Released in October - Featherweight
Shinsho Anzai - Released in June - Welterweight
Stefan Struve - Retired in February - Heavyweight
Sultan Aliev - Retired in April - Welterweight
Tarec Saffiedine - Released in November - Welterweight
Te Edwards - Released in December - Lightweight
Terrion Ware - Released in March - Bantamweight
Thomas Gifford - Released in November - Lightweight
Tim Boetsch - Retired in September - Middleweight
Tom Duquesnoy - Retired in May - Bantamweight
Wilson Reis - Released in May - Flyweight
Yoshinori Horie - Released in November - Featherweight
Yushin Okami - Signed with ONE Championship in February - Middleweight
Zak Ottow - Released in December - Welterweight

Debut UFC fighters

The following fighters fought their first UFC fight in 2019:

Abubakar Nurmagomedov - UFC Fight Night 163
Alonzo Menifield - UFC Fight Night: Cejudo vs. Dillashaw
Alen Amedovski - UFC Fight Night 149
Alex da Silva Coelho - UFC Fight Night 149
Amanda Ribas - UFC on ESPN 3
André Muniz - UFC Fight Night 164
Anthony Hernandez - UFC Fight Night 144
Antônio Arroyo - UFC Fight Night 164
Ariane Carnelossi - UFC Fight Night 159
Ariane Lipski - UFC Fight Night 143
Arman Tsarukyan - UFC Fight Night 149
Askar Askarov - UFC Fight Night 159
Austin Hubbard - UFC Fight Night 152
Bea Malecki - UFC Fight Night 153
Ben Askren - UFC 235
Ben Sosoli - UFC on ESPN 6 
Billy Quarantillo - UFC on ESPN 7
Boston Salmon - UFC 236
Brad Riddell - UFC 243
Brendan Allen - UFC on ESPN 6
Brianna Van Buren - UFC Fight Night 155
Bruno Gustavo da Silva - UFC 243
Callan Potter - UFC 234
Carlos Huachin - UFC 237
Casey Kenney - UFC on ESPN 2
Charles Jourdain - UFC Fight Night 152
Chase Hooper  - UFC 245
Ciryl Gane - UFC Fight Night 156
Cole Smith - UFC Fight Night 151
Cole Williams - UFC on ESPN 5
Jung Da Un - UFC Fight Night 157
Dalcha Lungiambula - UFC on ESPN 3
Danaa Batgerel - UFC Fight Night 157
Danilo Belluardo - UFC Fight Night 153
Dequan Townsend - UFC on ESPN 3
Derrick Krantz - UFC Fight Night 152
Deron Winn - UFC Fight Night 154
Diana Belbiţă - UFC on ESPN 6
Domingo Pilarte - UFC on ESPN 4
Don'Tale Mayes - UFC Fight Night 162
Duda Santana - UFC Fight Night 153
Fares Ziam - UFC 242
Felicia Spencer - UFC Fight Night 152
Felipe Colares - UFC Fight Night 144
Gabriel Silva - UFC on ESPN 4
Geraldo de Freitas - UFC Fight Night 144
Giga Chikadze - UFC Fight Night 160
Grant Dawson - UFC Fight Night 146
Greg Hardy - UFC Fight Night 143
Grigory Popov - UFC 238
Hannah Goldy - UFC on ESPN 5
Alateng Heili - UFC Fight Night 157
Hunter Azure - UFC Fight Night 158
Isabella de Padua - UFC Fight Night 164
Ismail Naurdiev - UFC Fight Night 145
Jack Shore - UFC Fight Night 160
Jacob Kilburn - UFC on ESPN 7
Jairzinho Rozenstruik - UFC Fight Night 144
Jamie Mullarkey - UFC 243
Jeff Hughes - UFC Fight Night 146
Joe Solecki - UFC on ESPN 7
Joel Álvarez - UFC Fight Night 145
John Allan - UFC Fight Night 155
Jonathan Pearce - UFC on ESPN 6
Jordan Espinosa - UFC Fight Night 148
Journey Newson - UFC on ESPN 3
Julia Avila - UFC 239
Park Jun-yong - UFC Fight Night 157
Justin Tafa - UFC 243
Karol Rosa - UFC Fight Night 157
Kennedy Nzechukwu - UFC on ESPN 2
Khadis Ibragimov - UFC Fight Night 157
Khama Worthy - UFC 241
Klidson Abreu - UFC Fight Night 145
Kron Gracie - UFC on ESPN 1
Kyle Prepolec - UFC Fight Night 151
Kyle Stewart - UFC Fight Night 143
Lara Procópio - UFC Fight Night 157
Lerone Murphy - UFC 242
Liana Jojua - UFC 242
Loma Lookboonmee  - UFC Fight Night 162
Luana Carolina - UFC 237
Luiz Eduardo Garagorri - UFC Fight Night 156
Makhmud Muradov - UFC Fight Night 160
Maki Pitolo - UFC 243
Mallory Martin - UFC on ESPN 7
Marc-André Barriault - UFC Fight Night 151
Marcos Rosa Mariano - UFC 234
Mario Bautista - UFC Fight Night 143
Mark Madsen - UFC Fight Night 160
Michel Pereira - UFC Fight Night 152
Miguel Baeza - UFC Fight Night 161
Mike Davis - UFC Fight Night 150
Mike Grundy - UFC Fight Night 147
Miles Johns - UFC Fight Night 158
Miranda Granger - UFC on ESPN 5
Mizuki Inoue - UFC Fight Night 157
Movsar Evloev - UFC Fight Night 149
Nicolae Negumereanu - UFC Fight Night 147
Nohelin Hernandez - UFC 239
Omar Morales - UFC Fight Night 165
Ottman Azaitar - UFC 242
Punahele Soriano  - UFC 245
Rafael Fiziev - UFC Fight Night 149
Raphael Pessoa - UFC Fight Night 156
Randy Costa - UFC 236
Raulian Paiva - UFC 234
Rodolfo Vieira - UFC Fight Night 156
Rodrigo Vargas - UFC Fight Night 156
Rogério Bontorin - UFC Fight Night 144
Roman Kopylov - UFC Fight Night 163
Rostem Akman - UFC Fight Night 153
Ryan MacDonald - UFC Fight Night 148
Sabina Mazo - UFC on ESPN 2
Sarah Frota - UFC Fight Night 144
Sean Brady - UFC on ESPN 6
Sean Woodson - UFC on ESPN 6 
Sergey Khandozhko - UFC Fight Night 153
Sergey Spivak - UFC Fight Night 151
Seung Woo Choi - UFC Fight Night 149
Shamil Gamzatov - UFC Fight Night 163
Sung Bin Jo - UFC Fight Night 153
Taila Santos - UFC Fight Night 144 
Takashi Sato - UFC Fight Night 150
Tanner Boser - UFC on ESPN 6
Thomas Gifford - UFC Fight Night 150
Tracy Cortez - UFC Fight Night 164
Tristan Connelly - UFC Fight Night 158
Tyson Nam - UFC Fight Night 159
Vanessa Melo - UFC Fight Night 159
Vinicius Moreira - UFC Fight Night 143
Virna Jandiroba - UFC Fight Night 150
Viviane Araújo - UFC 237
Wellington Turman - UFC Fight Night 155
Yorgan De Castro - UFC 243
Yoshinori Horie - UFC 240
Zarah Fairn Dos Santos - UFC 243
Zelim Imadaev - UFC 236

Suspended fighters

Title fights

Events list

See also
 UFC
 List of UFC champions
 List of UFC events
 List of current UFC fighters

References

External links
 UFC past events on UFC.com
 UFC events results at Sherdog.com

Ultimate Fighting Championship by year
2019 in mixed martial arts